Conus brunneobandatus is a species of sea snail, a marine gastropod mollusk in the family Conidae, the cone snails, cone shells or cones.

These snails are predatory and venomous. They are capable of "stinging" humans.

Description
The size of the shell attains 36.5 mm.

Distribution
Locus typicus: Off the mouth of the Orinoco River, Venezuela.

This species of cone snail occurs in the Caribbean Sea 
and off the Lesser Antilles; from Colombia to Northern Brasil.

References

 Petuch, E. J. 1992. Molluscan discoveries from the tropical Western Atlantic region. Part 1. New species of Conus from the Bahamas Platform, Central American and northern South American coasts, and the Lesser Antilles. La Conchiglia 23(264): 36-40.
 Tucker J.K. & Tenorio M.J. (2013) Illustrated catalog of the living cone shells. 517 pp. Wellington, Florida: MdM Publishing
 Puillandre N., Duda T.F., Meyer C., Olivera B.M. & Bouchet P. (2015). One, four or 100 genera? A new classification of the cone snails. Journal of Molluscan Studies. 81: 1-23

External links
 To World Register of Marine Species
 Cone Shells - Knights of the Sea
 

brunneobandatus
Gastropods described in 1992